John Lucas VC (1826 – 4 March 1892) was a British Army soldier and a recipient of the Victoria Cross, the highest award for gallantry in the face of the enemy that can be awarded to British and Commonwealth forces. He was the first member of the 40th Foot to be awarded the VC.

Early life
Lucas as born in Clashganny, Bagenalstown, County Carlow in 1826.

Victoria Cross
Lucas was approximately 35 years old, and a colour sergeant in the 40th (2nd Somersetshire) Regiment of Foot (later part of the South Lancashire Regiment – The Prince of Wales's Volunteers) of the British Army:

The action was part of the First Taranaki War during the New Zealand Wars. This campaign started over a disputed land sale at Waitara. In December 1860 British forces under Major General Thomas Simson Pratt carried out sapping operations against a major Māori defensive line called Te Arei ("The barrier") on the west side of the Waitara River and inland from Waitara, which was barring the way to the historic hill pā of Pukewairangi. The 18 March was the last day before a truce was declared.

Later career and life
By then promoted to sergeant-major, Lucas received his Victoria Cross from Lieutenant-General Duncan Cameron at Ellerslie Racecourse in Auckland, on 2 October 1862. 

He died in Dublin on 29 February 1892 and is buried there in St. James churchyard.

See also
List of New Zealand Wars Victoria Cross recipients

References

External links
Location of grave and VC medal (Dublin)

1826 births
1892 deaths
19th-century Irish people
Irish soldiers in the British Army
People from County Carlow
Irish recipients of the Victoria Cross
British military personnel of the New Zealand Wars
New Zealand Wars recipients of the Victoria Cross
South Lancashire Regiment soldiers
British Army recipients of the Victoria Cross
Military personnel from County Carlow
Burials in Dublin (county)